Kids See Ghosts (stylized in all-caps) was an American hip hop duo composed of musicians Kanye West and Kid Cudi. Formed in 2018 during West’s Wyoming sessions, the duo released their eponymous debut album in June of that year, through their respective label imprints, GOOD Music and Wicked Awesome Records. The duo disbanded in 2022.

History

Background and beginnings
In 2006, then-aspiring artist Kid Cudi first met rapper-producer Kanye West in a Virgin Megastore, as Cudi recounted in a 2009 SPIN interview: “I was looking at CDs, saw the gleam of a Jesus piece in the right side of my eye, looked up, and it was Kanye West,” Cudi said, adding that he introduced himself and offered West some of his music. Cudi would later run into West again, while Cudi was working at the BAPE store in NYC: "I remember Kanye coming in one time and I was helping him get a couple things," Cudi said. "I forgot to take a sensor off of one of the jackets he bought and I had to run out the store to catch him before he left. Pretty funny me chasing after him in SoHo."

In 2008, Kid Cudi caught the attention of Kanye West's A&R at the time, Plain Pat, who had initially met Cudi at a Def Jam meeting and picked up a copy of his demo. Plain Pat went on to introduce Cudi's music to West, subsequently leading West to sign Cudi to his GOOD Music imprint later that year. Following Cudi's signing to GOOD, he began heavily working with West. West first called upon Cudi to reference hooks for American rapper and mogul Jay-Z, and while in the studio Cudi and West went from working on The Blueprint 3 (2009) to West's R&B-esque fourth solo album, 808s & Heartbreak (2008). Cudi's assistance on the latter includes co-writing credits and/or vocals on "Heartless," "Welcome to Heartbreak," "Paranoid" and "RoboCop." Kid Cudi proved to be a prominent songwriter and featured artist on 808s & Heartbreak, with "Paranoid" and "Heartless" being released as singles respectively, while "Welcome to Heartbreak" charted as an album cut and peaked at number 87 on the Pop 100.

The two continued to work on Cudi's debut album Man on the Moon: The End of Day (2009), with West serving as an executive producer. West had also produced two songs, namely "Sky Might Fall" and the Common-assisted third single "Make Her Say", which West is also featured on. As of 2018, Cudi had contributed to every West album since 2008's 808s & Heartbreak, with their 2016 effort "Father Stretch My Hands", reaching the Top 40 of the US Billboard Hot 100 chart.

After a brief fallout, the two reconnected in late 2016, around the dissolution of West's Saint Pablo Tour, which ended in him being hospitalized. West abruptly canceled his Saint Pablo Tour and sought hospitalization for exhaustion in November 2016. At that time, West's only two live appearances since had both been with Cudi, who also sought mental health treatment in the fall of 2016, for performances of “Father Stretch My Hands Pt. 1” in November 2017 and February. As of 2018, West, however, had not appeared on one of Cudi's songs, or worked on any of his albums, since 2010's Man on the Moon II: The Legend of Mr. Rager.

Formation and debut
On April 19, 2018, West announced via Twitter that a collaborative album with Kid Cudi would be released in June. He followed the tweet revealing the name of the group, which also serves as title of their debut album, Kids See Ghosts. On April 22, again via Twitter, West unveiled the album artwork, which was composed by Tokyo-based artist Takashi Murakami. The duo were originally photographed with Murakami in July 2017. On April 25, West revealed the album would be accompanied by a short film, directed by Dexter Navy, a music video director notable for his collaborations with The Neighbourhood and ASAP Rocky.

On June 8, their eponymous debut album was released following a live listening party in Santa Clarita, California. Kids See Ghosts debuted at number two on the US Billboard 200 chart with 142,000 album-equivalent units, of which 79,000 were pure album sales. It serves as West's tenth top-five album and Cudi's sixth top-five album in the United States. All seven tracks on the album debuted in the Billboard Hot 100 chart. The track "Reborn" managed to chart in the Top 40 of the US Hot 100, at number 39.

Cudi revealed in July 2018, that he and West will continue to release music as Kids See Ghosts. "There are some songs that we didn't use that I’m hopeful we can put out later," Cudi explained in an interview with Billboard. "But the plan is to do more Kids See Ghosts albums... We just have this chemistry that's undeniable, especially when we have to fight for it with each other."

The duo made their live debut under the moniker at Tyler, the Creator’s Camp Flog Gnaw Carnival on November 11, 2018. They performed their album in entirety as well as Cudi featured Kanye songs "Father Stretch My Hands Pt. 1", "Welcome to Heartbreak", "Paranoid", and "Ghost Town", and Cudi's single "Pursuit of Happiness." At Cudi's 2019 Coachella set, West joined him onstage for performances of "Feel the Love", "Reborn", "Father Stretch My Hands Pt. 1", "Ghost Town", and "Ghost Town Pt. 2". 070 Shake and Ty Dolla $ign, frequent collaborators of the duo, came onstage for their features on the latter two songs.

Unrealized projects

KSG2
In a September 2019 interview with Complex, Kid Cudi assured fans that more material from him and Kanye West would be coming. "There will be more Kids See Ghosts albums. Kanye already told me he wants to start working on the second one," he said. "With the first album, I didn't know how serious he was about making a collab album with me," he continued. "He had mentioned it, but I thought it was just a good idea he had in the moment. But then he kept bringing it up and kept having me come to his house, listen to music, and work on beats, so I was like, 'Wow, he's really into this.' We had a discussion where he said he wanted to make a spiritual album and I told him, 'Great. That's what I do. I would love to do that, something I can sink my teeth into.' So there will definitely be more."

Animated series
On June 26, 2020, a computer-animated series directed by artist Takashi Murakami was announced via social media. The series chronicles the adventures of Kanye Bear, the character portrayed on West's first three album covers, and Kid Fox, a character created exclusively for the show, both of whom acting as cartoon personae for the artists. The show currently has no scheduled release date and is unlikely to air due to the group's split.

Dissolvement of creative partnership
On April 19, 2022, exactly four years after the announcement of the group, Kid Cudi announced that "Rock n Roll", on Pusha T's fourth album It's Almost Dry, would be his final collaboration with West due to the latter artist's recent behaviour, therefore dissolving the duo's partnership. Cudi stated on Twitter that "I did this song a year ago when I was still cool [with] Kanye. I am not cool [with] that man. He's not my friend and I only cleared the song for Pusha cuz thats my guy. This is the last song [you] will hear me on [with] Kanye."

Discography

Studio albums

Charted songs

Appearances together

See also
List of songs recorded by Kanye West
List of songs recorded by Kid Cudi

References

Further reading
 A Timeline of Kanye West & Kid Cudi's Relationship, Up to Their Performance Together in Chicago. Billboard. Retrieved April 25, 2018
 The 12 Best Kanye West & Kid Cudi Collaborations: Critic's Picks. Billboard. Retrieved April 26, 2018
 Kanye West & Kid Cudi's Musical Partnership: A Full Timeline. Highsnobiety. Retrieved April 26, 2018

Musical groups established in 2018
Musical groups disestablished in 2022
American hip hop groups
African-American musical groups
Alternative hip hop groups
Hip hop supergroups
American musical duos
Kanye West
GOOD Music artists
Hip hop duos
Midwest hip hop groups
Psychedelic musical groups
2018 establishments in the United States
2022 disestablishments in the United States
Kid Cudi